Georgi Kandelaki (born 10 April 1974) is a Georgian former boxer and current boxing administrator. He competed in the 1996 Summer Olympics, at the 1997 World Amateur Boxing Championships he became the first Georgian to win a World Championship, and from 2002 to 2003 held the World Boxing Union heavyweight title.

Early life
Kandelaki was born in the village of Variani and was introduced to boxing by his father, Tarash Kandelaki. In 1991, he completed Variani secondary school, and went on to study at the Gori State University Economics Department.

Amateur career
In 1992 Kandelaki won the Junior World Championships in the heavyweight class, and in 1993 he won the European Championships and reached the final of the World Championships, where he lost by default to Félix Savón.

In the 1995 World Championships, he reached the quarter-finals having beaten Friday Ahunanya, and again lost by default to Félix Savón.

Representing Georgia at the 1996 Summer Olympics, he defeated Thompson Garcia and Wojciech Bartnik before losing to Félix Savón in the quarter-finals. In the European Championships the same year, he lost to Christophe Mendy in the quarter-finals.

In 1997, he fought in the super heavyweight class in the World Championships, and defeated Vitali Boot, Petr Horáček, Jean-Francois Bergeron and Sergei Liakhovich to reach the final, where he won the title against Alexis Rubalcaba.

Highlights

 Soviet Junior Tournament (81 kg), April 1989:
 (no data available)
 International Junior Tournament (91 kg), Tbilisi, Georgian SSR, December 1990:
1/2: Defeated Tomasz Bonin (Poland) RSC 1
Finals: Defeated Nikolay Pyatakov (RSFSR) by unanimous decision, 5–0
 Ahmet Comert Tournament (91 kg), Istanbul, Turkey, May 1992:
 (no data available)
 Junior World Championships (91 kg), Montreal, Canada, September-October 1992:
1/8: Defeated Robert Geer (United States) 7–0
1/4: Defeated Ismael Kone (Sweden) 11–1
1/2: Defeated Peer Mueller (Germany) 6–4
Finals: Defeated Stephen Gallinger (Canada) 19–2
 World Championships (91 kg), Tampere, Finland, May 1993:
1/8: Defeated Bert Teuchert (Germany) 10–9
1/4: Defeated Mikael Höök (Sweden) 7–0
1/2: Defeated Arshak Avartakyan (Armenia) 7–2
Finals: Lost to Félix Savón (Cuba) by walkover
 European Championships (91 kg), Bursa, Turkey, September 1993:
1/16: Defeated Peter Saat (Estonia) 8–1
1/8: Defeated Fyodor Mishko (Belarus) 9–2
1/4: Defeated Fikret Güneş (Turkey) 4–2
1/2: Defeated Georgios Stefanopoulos (Greece) 7–4
Finals: Defeated Don Diego Poeder (Netherlands) 11–2
 Chemistry Cup (91 kg), Halle, Germany, March 1994:
1/2: Lost to Jan Bezvoda (Czech Republic) 1–3
 World Cup (91 kg), Bangkok, Thailand, June 1994:
1/4: Defeated Friday Ahunanya (Nigeria) 6–4
1/2: Lost to Félix Savón (Cuba) 4–19

 Chemistry Cup (+91 kg), Halle, Germany, March 1995:
1/2: Defeated Timo Hoffmann (Germany) 11–1
Finals: Lost to Vitali Klitschko (Ukraine) by walkover
World Championships (91 kg), Berlin, Germany, May 1995:
1/8: Defeated Jonas Dambrauskas (Lithuania) 4–2
1/4: Lost to Félix Savón (Cuba) by walkover
 100th Anniversary Tournament (91 kg), Moscow, Russia, October 1995:
Finals: Defeated Sergey Sosnin (Russia) by unanimous decision, 5–0
 Strandzha Cup (91 kg), Sofia, Bulgaria, February 1996:
1/4: Defeated Oleg Belikov (Ukraine) 5–2
1/2: Lost to Christophe Mendy (France) RET 2
European Championships (91 kg), Vejle, Denmark, March-April 1996:
1/16: Defeated Gioacchino Mocerino (Italy) 10–6
1/8: Defeated Sergey Dychkov (Belarus) 7–4
1/4: Lost to Christophe Mendy (France) 2–7
Summer Olympics (91 kg), Atlanta, Georgia, July 1996:
1/16: Defeated Thompson García (Ecuador) RET 3
1/8: Defeated Wojciech Bartnik (Poland) 6–1
1/4: Lost to Félix Savón (Cuba) 4–20 
Tammer Tournament (+91 kg), Tampere, Finland, September 1997:
1/4: Defeated Rimantas Prišmantas (Lithuania) 3–0
1/4: Lost to Patrick Halberg (Denmark) 1–6
 World Championships (+91 kg), Budapest, Hungary, October 1997:
1/16: Defeated Vitali Boot (Germany) 4–2 (5 rds)
1/8: Defeated Petr Horáček (Czech Republic) RSCI 4
1/4: Defeated Jean-François Bergeron (Canada) 7–3 (5 rds)
1/2: Defeated Sergey Lyakhovich (Belarus) 5–3 (5 rds)
Finals: Defeated Alexis Rubalcaba (Cuba) 4–1 (5 rds)

Professional career
In 1998, Kandelaki started boxing as a professional for Panix Promotions. In 2002, he won the World Boxing Union heavyweight title. In 2003, he retired unbeaten because of an eye injury.

Retirement and later life
After his boxing career, Kandelaki founded the Georgian Professional Boxing Association and became its president. He trained boys as boxers in his home village of Variani and other villages. He was mentioned in the book The President, the World Champion and I by Lali Moroshkina.

Professional boxing record

|-
|align="center" colspan=11|24 Wins (18 knockouts, 6 decisions)
|-
!No.
!Result
!BilledWgt
!Opponent
!OppWgt
!Opp Record
!Type
!Round,time
!Date
!Location
!Notes
|-
|24||Win||238|| Alexey Osokin||227||11–17–1||TKO||3 (6)||17 Oct 2003|| Sports Palace, Tbilisi, Georgia||
|-
|23||Win||237½|| Alexander Vasiliev||223||15–9–1||TKO||12 (12)||21 Dec 2002|| Yubileyny Sports Palace, Saint Petersburg, Russia||
|-
|22||Win||?|| Eric French||?||10–24–3||TKO||1 (6)||21 Sep 2002|| Circus, Kyiv, Ukraine||
|-
|21||Win||240|| Derek McCafferty||246||2–6–0||RTD||5 (8), ||25 May 2002|| Mountbatten Centre, Portsmouth, Hampshire, United Kingdom||
|-
|20||Win||236½|| Alexey Varakin||218½||17–9–2||TKO||1 (8), ||2 Mar 2002|| York Hall, Bethnal Green, London, United Kingdom||
|-
|19||Win||243¾|| Alexey Osokin||236||9–13–1||UD||6 (6)||20 Dec 2001|| Giant Hall, Casino Conti, Saint Petersburg, Russia||
|-
|18||Win||?|| Ilia Tlashadze||?||3–0–0||KO||3||23 Oct 2001|| Variani, Georgia||
|-
|17||Win||233½|| Sam Ubokane||226¾||9–1–0||TKO||4 (6)||29 Jan 2001|| Bushfield Leisure Centre, Peterborough, Cambridgeshire, United Kingdom||
|-
|16||Win||?|| Joey Guy||?||27–3–0||TKO||4 (8)||26 Oct 2000|| Sports Palace, Tbilisi, Georgia||
|-
|15||Win||231|| Harry Senior||?||7–8–1||PTS||8 (8)||13 Jul 2000|| York Hall, Bethnal Green, London, United Kingdom||
|-
|14||Win||225|| Rodney McSwain||218||7–11–0||PTS||6 (6)||29 Apr 2000|| The Arena, Wembley, London, United Kingdom||
|-
|13||Win||220|| Antoine Palatis||227¼||27–10–2||PTS||8 (8)||21 Feb 2000|| Elephant & Castle Centre, Southwark, London, United Kingdom||
|-
|12||Win||235¾|| Derek McCafferty||238||2–2–0||PTS||8 (8)||18 Dec 1999|| Elephant & Castle Centre, Southwark, London, United Kingdom||
|-
|11||Win||228|| Mark Young||242||14–36–1||KO||2 (8)||8 Oct 1999|| Sports Palace, Tbilisi, Georgia||
|-
|10||Win||224¾|| Kimmuel Odum||220||17–29–1||TKO||1 (8)||21 Aug 1999|| Batumi, Georgia||
|-
|9||Win||226½|| Spas Spasov||211||7–6–0||TKO||1 (8), ||15 Jul 1999|| Werrington Sports Centre, Peterborough, Cambridgeshire, United Kingdom||
|-
|8||Win||225¾|| Yuriy Yelistratov||226¼||19–10–1||KO||1 (6), ||22 Jun 1999|| Corn Exchange, Ipswich, Suffolk, United Kingdom||
|-
|7||Win||228¾|| Emile Ramon||224¾||4–4–0||TKO||1 (6), ||22 May 1999|| Maysfield Leisure Centre, Belfast, Northern Ireland, United Kingdom||
|-
|6||Win||230½|| Laszlo Paszterko||219¼||15–31–4||TKO||2 (6), ||24 Apr 1999|| Planet Ice Rink, Peterborough, Cambridgeshire, United Kingdom||
|-
|5||Win||231½|| Johnny Davison||203||0–9–0||TKO||2 (6), || 6 Mar 1999|| Elephant & Castle Centre, Southwark, London, United Kingdom||
|-
|4||Win||231¾|| Ladislav Husarik||273||5–19–1||PTS||6 (6)||6 Feb 1999|| North Bridge Leisure Centre, Halifax, Yorkshire, United Kingdom||
|-
|3||Win||231|| Jean Marie Naandu||201||4–9–0||KO||1 (6), ||12 Dec 1998|| Northgate Arena, Chester, Cheshire, United Kingdom||
|-
|2||Win||234¾|| Steven Archie||241||||TKO||2 (4)||26 Sep 1998|| Mohegan Sun Casino, Uncasville, Connecticut, USA||
|-
|1||Win||242½|| Shane Woollas||232||8–10–0||TKO||2 (4), ||2 Jul 1998|| Corn Exchange, Ipswich, Suffolk, United Kingdom||
|}

Mixed martial arts record

|-    
| Win 
|align=center| 2-2  
| Mitsuya Nagai    
| KO    
| RINGS - Mega Battle Tournament 1993: Second Round
|     
|align=center| 1    
|align=center| 7:19    
| Tokyo, Japan    
|  
|- 
| Loss 
|align=center| 1-2
| Yoshihisa Yamamoto
| Decision
| RINGS - Battle Dimension: Osaka Metropolitan Circuit II
|  
|align=center| 5 
|align=center| 3:00 
| Nagoya, Japan
|
|-    
| Win 
|align=center| 1-1  
| Vladimir Kravchuk   
| KO    
| RINGS - Mega Battle Tournament 1992: Semi-Finals
|     
|align=center| 2    
|align=center| 1:38    
| Tokyo, Japan    
|   
|- 
| Loss 
|align=center| 0-1
| Hans Nijman 
| KO
| RINGS - Mega Battle Tournament 1992: First Round
|  
|align=center| 4 
|align=center| 0:35 
| Nagoya, Japan
|
|-

References

External links
  (history)
 Georgi Kandelaki Boxing Record at BoxingRecords.com

1974 births
Living people
Georgian people of Greek descent
Male boxers from Georgia (country)
Heavyweight boxers
Super-heavyweight boxers
Boxers at the 1996 Summer Olympics
Olympic boxers of Georgia (country)
World boxing champions
People from Shida Kartli
AIBA World Boxing Championships medalists
Recipients of the Presidential Order of Excellence